Foch is an unincorporated community in Boone County in the U.S. state of West Virginia.

References 

Unincorporated communities in Boone County, West Virginia
Unincorporated communities in West Virginia
Charleston, West Virginia metropolitan area